Alexander Boldizar (born in Czechoslovakia, now Slovak Republic, 1971) is a writer, lawyer and art critic. He was the first post-independence Slovak citizen to graduate with a Juris Doctor degree from Harvard Law School. His writing has won a PEN prize (PEN/Nob Hill), represented Bread Loaf Writers' Conference as a nominee for the Best New American Voices anthology, and received various other awards.

Life
Born in Košice, Czechoslovakia, in 1971, Boldizar's family escaped to Austria via Yugoslavia in 1979. After six months in a refugee camp at Traiskirchen, Austria, Canada granted the family asylum. Boldizar became a Canadian citizen in 1983. He attended Merivale High School in Ottawa, where he was captain of the rugby team, followed by McGill University, from which he graduated in 1994 with the Brian Coughlan prize for highest GPA in the economics department. He also won the 1993 McGill Open Beer Mile championship.

Boldizar went on to study law at Harvard Law School, starting in the class of 1998 but finishing in the class of 1999 due to a year of absence during which he went to the Sahara (Niger, Africa) with a paleontological expedition for the Discovery Channel/National Geographic. During his last year, he was roommates with Samantha Power, the former U.S. ambassador to the United Nations.

Although Boldizar had renounced his Czechoslovak citizenship in 1989 so that he could attend the anticommunist demonstrations as a noncitizen (during which he was almost arrested anyway), President Rudolf Schuster of Slovakia revived Boldizar's citizenship by special presidential order in 1999, making him the first Slovak citizen to graduate with a JD from Harvard. Boldizar's grandfather, Vojtech Zahorsky, was awarded the Kosice Prize (i.e., "keys to the city") for his contributions as a partisan during WWII and his service as the head of the Slovak Veteran's Association.

Boldizar currently lives in Vancouver, BC, Canada. He won first place in his division at the British Columbia Brazilian jiu-jitsu Championships in both 2010 and 2011, a gold medal at the 2011 Pan American Championships and a bronze at the 2013 World Masters Championships.

Career
Boldizar worked briefly as an attorney at the San Francisco and Prague offices of Baker & McKenzie, before leaving law in order to write. He has been an art gallery director in Indonesia, a "host" in a hostess bar in Japan, a hermit in Tennessee, a paleontologists' guide in the Sahara, a porter on Bylot Island in the Canadian High Arctic, a speechwriter for the police-oversight Civilian Complaint Review Board in New York City, and an editor of the first pan-Asian art magazine.

He has published over eighty articles in fiction venues like Transition Magazine, Fiction International, Chicago Quarterly Review, Literary Imagination, and Phantasmagoria, nonfiction venues like Harper's Bazaar, The Globe and Mail, Shambhala Sun, Liberty Magazine, C-Arts Magazine, and Harvard Law Record, and legal venues like the European Journal of International Law and Golden Gate Law Review. He worked as an editor of C-Arts Magazine, a contemporary art magazine published out of Singapore, for which he has interviewed artists like Damien Hirst and Ashley Bickerton.

He has one novel, titled The Ugly, about Muzhduk the Ugli the Fourth, a member of a lost tribe of boulder-throwing Slovaks living in the mountains of Siberia whose land is stolen by American lawyers. An absurdist satire of law, The Ugly was voted the top new release of September 2016 on Goodreads and was named one of the "Best Books of 2016: Best Fiction" by Entropy Magazine.

The Harvard Law Record published a profile of Boldizar's career in March 2010. He has also been profiled on Allie Bates' Novelspot and on Slovak Spectrum television. Kanadsky Slovak newspaper named him one of the most notable Slovaks "in Canada and probably in North America."

Style
Boldizar has been described as "a boisterous Borges" and writes in the existentialist satire and dark humor tradition of writers like Heller, Kafka, Musil, Hrabal, Borges, and Laurence Sterne.

References

External links
 http://boldizar.com
 http://theuglynovel.com
 https://web.archive.org/web/20110715022529/http://www.othercriteria.com/blog/2009/09/21/alexander-boldizar-and-damien-hirst-in-conversation/
 https://web.archive.org/web/20110317063755/http://www.hlrecord.org/arts-culture/alexander-boldizar-from-law-school-to-novelist-and-art-critic-1.1266491

Canadian non-fiction writers
Harvard Law School alumni
Czechoslovak emigrants to Canada
1971 births
Living people
Writers from Vancouver
Writers from Košice